Portrait is the sixth studio album by English singer Rick Astley released in 2005. A collection of covers of pop standards, it is his first studio album since 2001's Keep It Turned On, and the first to be released in the UK since 1993's Body & Soul.

Track listing 
"Vincent" (Don McLean) – 3:24
"And I Love You So" (McLean) – 2:55
"Portrait of My Love" (Norman Newell, Cyril Ornadel) – 2:43
"Where Do I Begin?" (Francis Lai, Carl Sigman) – 3:36
"These Foolish Things" (Jack Strachey, Eric Maschwitz) – 3:49
"Cry Me a River" (Arthur Hamilton) – 4:03
"Nature Boy" (George Aberle) – 3:12
"Close to You" (Burt Bacharach, Hal David) – 3:04
"You Belong to Me" (Chilton Price, John Kuczynski, Henry Stewart) – 2:49
"Make It Easy on Yourself" (Bacharach, David) – 2:57
"Somewhere" (Leonard Bernstein, Stephen Sondheim) – 2:46
"I Can't Help Falling in Love (with You)" (Hugo Peretti, Luigi Creatore, George David Weiss) – 3:14
"What the World Needs Now" (Bacharach, David) – 3:00
"You're Nobody till Somebody Loves You" (Russ Morgan, Lazarus Goldberger, James Cavanaugh) – 3:31 (Japanese release only)

Personnel 
 Rick Astley – vocals 
 Tim Lauer – keyboards, orchestrations
 John Carin – additional piano (1), guitars (1), stardust (1)
 Dan Petty – acoustic guitar 
 Davey Johnstone – electric guitar, slide guitar
 Craig Young – bass 
 Shannon Forrest – drums, percussion 
 John Altman – soprano saxophone (4, 8)
 Suzie Katayama – orchestra contractor

Production 
 Peter Collins – producer 
 Clif Norrell – engineer, mixing (7)
 Andy Brohard – assistant engineer 
 Gary Langan – mixing (1-6, 8-13)
 Alexander "Natty" Modiano – mix assistant 
 Stylorouge – art direction, design 
 Uli Weber – photography

Charts

References

2005 albums
Rick Astley albums
Covers albums
RCA Records albums
Sony BMG albums